Bernard (died in 1164) was bishop of Poznań from 1159–1164.

He was a German, and arrived in the parish of Princess Salomei of Berg.

He performed as a witness on the privilege of the princess for the monastery in Mogilno from around 1143 and as a prefect of the collegiate church of St. Peter in Kruszwica.

King Lubinski made him a bishop from 1159 until his death in 1164.

References

Bishops of Poznań
12th-century Roman Catholic bishops in Poland
1164 deaths